was a former justice on the Supreme Court of Japan. In spring 2009, Ueda was awarded the highest decoration of Japan, the Grand Cordon of the Order of the Rising Sun. Before being appointed to the Supreme Court in 2002, he headed the courts in Osaka and in Hiroshima and served as a judge in Tokyo and Maebashi.

References

Supreme Court of Japan justices
Living people
1937 births
Grand Cordons of the Order of the Rising Sun